The 2022 Inter Miami CF season was the third season of existence for Inter Miami CF. They participated in Major League Soccer, the top tier of soccer in the United States. Outside of MLS, the club also participated in the U.S. Open Cup.

Background

Review

Offseason

Management

|-
!colspan="2" style="background:#F7B5CD; color:#000000; text-align:left" |Ownership
|-

|-
!colspan="2" style="background:#F7B5CD; color:#000000; text-align:left" |Front Office
|-

|-
!colspan="2" style="background:#F7B5CD; color:#000000; text-align:left" |Coaching Staff
|-

Roster

Transfers

Transfers in

Transfers out

MLS SuperDraft

Non-competitive

Preseason

Carolina Challenge Cup

Friendlies

Competitive

Major League Soccer

Standings

Eastern Conference

Overall table

Results summary

Results by round

Match results

MLS Cup Playoffs

U.S. Open Cup

Statistics

Overall 
{|class="wikitable"
|-
|Games played ||34
|-
|Games won ||14
|-
|Games drawn ||6  
 |-
|Games lost ||14
|-
|Goals scored ||47
|-
|Goals conceded ||56
|-
|Goal difference ||-9
|-
|Clean sheets ||6
|-
|Yellow cards ||68
|-
|Red cards ||5
|-
|Worst discipline || Damion Lowe
|-
|Best result(s) ||4-1 (Orlando City SC)
|-
|Worst result(s) ||5-1 (Austin FC)
|-
|Most appearances || Christopher McVey & DeAndre Yedlin
|-
|Top scorer ||Gonzalo Higuaín
|-
|Points || 48
|-

Appearances and goals

Top scorers

Top assists

Disciplinary record

Clean sheets

Awards and honors

References

2022
2022 Major League Soccer season
American soccer clubs 2022 season
2022 in sports in Florida